Buari Olalekan Oluwasegun (born 2 April 1987; professionally known as Unlimited L.A) is a Nigerian music video director.

He has worked with several musical genres and artists including Olamide, Phyno, Timaya, and many others.

Early life
Buari Olalekan Oluwasegun was born on April 2, 1987,  to the family of Mr. and Mrs. Buari in Lagos State, Nigeria. He is a cousin to the Ace Music Video director DJ Tee

Career
Since 2011, he has worked for many musical artists in directing their music videos, prominently Olamide.

In 2015, he won Best Director at the 2015 Nigeria Entertainment Awards, and won Best Music Video at The Headies 2015, and also earned a nomination at All Africa Music Awards.

In 2016, he was nominated at The Headies 2016 and 2016 Nigeria Entertainment Awards for Best Music Video.

In 2017, he won Best Director of the year at the City People Entertainment Awards

Videography

Commercials
 Essenza Beauty
 Galaxy Note 9
 Omaha Electronics
 Legend Extra Stout
 Gala
 Glo

Awards and nominations

References

External links
 

Living people
Nigerian film directors
Nigerian cinematographers
Nigerian music video directors
1987 births